Blue on Blue is Bobby Vinton's sixth studio album, released in 1963. Cover versions include the jazz songs "St. Louis Blues" and "Blueberry Hill", "Am I Blue", "Blue, Blue Day", the Fleetwoods' hit "Mr. Blue", "My Blue Heaven", three show tunes ("Blue Skies", "Blue Hawaii" and "Blue Moon"), and The Clovers Rhythm and blues hit, "Blue Velvet".

The song "Blue on Blue" was mentioned in Kim Mitchell's hit song "Patio Lanterns".

Composition and background
Completely devoted to songs that refer to the color blue, this album contained two singles: "Blue on Blue", which reached #3 on the U.S. Pop charts and "Blue Velvet", which went on to #1 for three weeks on the same chart. Both songs served as title tracks during their popularity. The album was released after the success of the song "Blue on Blue", but when "Blue Velvet" became a hit, the album's title was changed with it being the title track. It was only after the title change that the album managed to enter the Billboard 200 list of popular albums; it reached #10.

Track listing

Personnel
Bob Morgan - producer
Burt Bacharach - arranger, conductor
Hank Parker - cover photo

Charts
Album - Billboard (United States)

Singles - Billboard (United States)

References 

Blue on Blue (album)
Blue on Blue (album)
Epic Records albums
Albums conducted by Burt Bacharach
Albums arranged by Burt Bacharach
Covers albums